China Beach is a small cove in San Francisco's Sea Cliff neighborhood. It lies between Baker Beach and Lands End and is part of the Golden Gate National Recreation Area. It was previously known as James D. Phelan State Beach Park. It was once used as a campsite for Chinese fishermen. Swimming is not safe at China Beach because of many possible dangers and the lack of lifeguards in the area. At low tides, there are tide pools to discover, and it is sometimes possible to walk to Baker Beach. China Beach offers a view of the Golden Gate Bridge and the Marin Headlands.

A marker on the trailhead leading down to the beach states:

"CHINA BEACH
 Since gold rush times, this cove was used as a campsite by many of the Chinese fishermen who worked in and around San Francisco Bay. Their efforts to supply the needs of a young city helped establish one of the area's most important industries and traditions. Gift of Henry & Diana Chung Family 1981."

See also
List of beaches in California
List of California state parks

References

External links
China Beach at the National Parks Conservancy

Beaches of San Francisco
Golden Gate National Recreation Area
San Francisco Bay Area beaches
Parks in San Francisco
Beaches of Northern California